The intergluteal cleft or just gluteal cleft, also known by a number of synonyms, including natal cleft, butt crack, and cluneal cleft, is the groove between the buttocks that runs from just below the sacrum to the perineum, so named because it forms the visible border between the external rounded protrusions of the gluteus maximus muscles. Other names are the anal cleft, crena analis, crena interglutealis, and rima ani. Colloquially the intergluteal cleft is known as bum crack (UK) or butt crack (US). The intergluteal cleft is located superior to the anus.

There are several disorders that can affect the intergluteal cleft including inverse psoriasis, caudal regression syndrome, and pilonidal disease.

See also
 Buttock cleavage
 Rectum
Anal canal

 
Anatomical terms of location

References

External links

Buttocks